Óengus mac Fergusa may refer to:

Óengus I (before 700–761), monarch a/k/a Onuist, anglicised as Angus son of Fergus, who, from 732 to 761, reigned as king of Pictland, also referenced as Pictavia, located in northeastern region of land later unified as Scotland
Óengus II (before 780–834), king of Picts, a/k/a Onuist, Hungus or Angus, from 820 until 834, traditionally associated with cult of Saint Andrew and flag of Scotland; included in Duan Albanach's praise poem from reign of Máel Coluim

See also
Óengus, referenced as Aengus
Angus (disambiguation)